The Royal Canadian Chaplain Service is a personnel branch of the Canadian Armed Forces that has approximately 192 Regular Force chaplains and 145 Reserve Force chaplains representing the Christian, Muslim and Jewish faiths. From 1969 to 2014 it was named the Chaplain Branch. It was renamed on October 16, 2014.

Mission and vision
The mission of this branch is to "support and enhance the effectiveness of the CF as a whole – its leadership, the individual men and women who serve and their families – through the provision of comprehensive religious and spiritual support, advice, and care."

The vision of the Chaplaincy is to "be an operationally relevant Chaplaincy that supports and cares for all CF personnel and their families, wherever they live and serve, empowering them spiritually and morally to meet the demands of military service."

Role
Foster the religious, spiritual and moral well-being of members and their families
Offer a ministry of presence in a multitude of environments (at home and abroad)
Participate in the life of the worshipping community
Officiate at special functions
Advise the commanding officer regarding the spiritual and ethical well-being and morale of their unit
Liaise with civilian religious faith groups
Collaborate with other care providers
Provide directed care after critical incidents

Leading prayer
In accordance with their role, chaplains offer prayer services at home and abroad. Some services are inherently religious, such as Sunday worship, baptisms or religious funerals and burial at sea ceremonies. Other times, chaplains may offer a prayer for secular occasions such as base divisions, changes of command, mess dinners or ship commissioning ceremonies.  Before offering prayers during parades and ceremonies, it is customary that the order to remove headdress be given to those on parade. In November 2004, Court Martial Appeal Court of Canada ruled that this order was "not lawful" since it unjustifiably required all attendees to show participation in a prayer that they may not believe. Following this ruling, non-Christians are now permitted to retain their headdress, just like Jews and Sikhs do in accordance with their faith.

Training

Canadian Forces Chaplain School and Centre
The Canadian Forces Chaplain School and Centre (CFChSC) in Borden, Ontario, is responsible for the training of all chaplains (Regular and Reserve, Protestant, Roman Catholic, Muslim and Jewish). CFChSC provides training in operational and static ministry. 
The training is provided with an operational focus and an interfaith approach. Courses are available in both official languages English and French. Courses include Chaplain Basic Officer Training, Ethics, Pastoral Counselling, Chaplains in Deployed Operations, Intermediate, Advanced, Chapel Life Coordinator (Protestant and Roman Catholic), and Ministry in a Pluralistic Environment. CFChSC prepares military chaplains for service in times of peace and times of conflict. The Resource Centre contains a library relating to ministry, religion and related areas. The Chaplains provide ministry to Canadian Forces personnel and their families.

Annual Royal Canadian Chaplain Service Exercise

Since the amalgamation of the former Protestant and Roman Catholic Chaplaincies in the mid-1990s into a single multi-faith Canadian Forces Chaplaincy, a joint exercise. Consisting of seminars, business meetings and worship services, the annual exercise provides opportunities for the professional and spiritual development of chaplains and for fellowship as a Branch. The Annual Protestant Chaplain Branch Retreat and Seminar was held annually at the Royal Military College of Canada in Kingston, Ontario in the late 1980s and 1990s.

Noncombatant status

Badges

On 24 September 2006, the Department of National Defence issued a press release indicating that, "[i]n order to better represent the diversity of Canadian society, and reflect the multi-faith nature of today’s chaplaincy", the current branch cap badge would be replaced with three new badges. The new badges would retain the crowned wreath of red maple leaves and central blue circle; the Maltese Cross behind the circle would be removed. On the circle would be "a different symbol for each faith tradition: for Christian chaplains, the Maltese cross, which has long been associated with Christian chaplaincy. Jewish chaplains will wear the symbol of the tablets of the Law and the Magen David (the star of David) and Muslim chaplains will wear the crescent." A scroll with the motto  would be placed below the circle. These badges were approved by the Canadian Heraldic Authority on 15 March 2006.

Chaplain general

The current Chaplain General is Brigadier-General J.L.G Bélisle.

Order of precedence

See also

Armed Forces Chaplaincy Center (U.S. chaplain training)
Military Ordinariate of Canada
Royal Canadian Army Chaplain Corps
Royal Military College of Canada chapels

Gallery

Footnotes

External links
Canadian Forces Recruiting
Canadian Forces and Department of National Defence
History of Chaplain Branch

Canadian Armed Forces personnel branches
Canadian Armed Forces
 
Religion in Canada
Military history of Canada
1969 establishments in Canada